An analyst is an individual who performs analysis of a topic. The term may refer to:

In business and finance
 Business analyst, an employee who examines the needs and concerns of clients and stakeholders
 Financial analyst, an individual who analyzes securities and business equity in economics and finance
 Industry analyst, an individual who performs market research on segments of industries to identify trends in business and finance
 Marketing analyst, a person who analyzes price, customer, competitor and economic data to help companies
 Quantitative analyst, applies mathematical techniques to investment banking, especially in the fields of risk management, trading, and financial derivatives

In physical sciences
 Analyst (journal), a chemistry journal
 Analyst (software), mass spectrometry software
 Public analyst, a qualified chemist appointed by a local authority in the UK

In social sciences
 Behavior Analyst, a professional who practices applied behavior science
 Intelligence analyst, in government intelligence
 Psychoanalyst, a practitioner who acts to facilitate understanding of a patient's unconscious mind

In other fields
 Color analyst, a sports commentator who assists the main commentator
 Handwriting analyst, a person who performs a personality assessment through handwriting
 News analyst, examines and interprets broadcast news
 Numerical analyst, develops and analyzes numerical algorithms
 Public policy analyst, an individual who analyzes the effect of public policies with respect to their goals
 Systems analyst, an individual who analyzes technical design and functional design for software development

See also 
 The Analyst (disambiguation)
 The Analyst, a 1734 famous criticism by Bishop Berkeley
 Annalists, historians in ancient Rome